Cham Ruteh (also Romanized as Cham Rūteh) is a village in Rudbar Rural District, Central District, Sirvan County, Ilam Province, Iran. At the 2006 census, its population was 481, in 101 families. The village is populated by Arabs.

References 

Populated places in Sirvan County
Arab settlements in llam Province